Under Oath is a 1922 American silent drama film directed by George Archainbaud and starring Elaine Hammerstein, Mahlon Hamilton and Niles Welch.

Cast
 Elaine Hammerstein as Shirley Marvin
 Mahlon Hamilton as Jim Powers
 Niles Welch as Hartley Peters
 Carl Gerard as Steve Powers
 T.D. Crittenden as Chester Marvin 
 Wallace MacDonald as 	Ralph Marvin

References

Bibliography
 Connelly, Robert B. The Silents: Silent Feature Films, 1910-36, Volume 40, Issue 2. December Press, 1998.
 Munden, Kenneth White. The American Film Institute Catalog of Motion Pictures Produced in the United States, Part 1. University of California Press, 1997.

External links
 

1922 films
1922 drama films
1920s English-language films
American silent feature films
Silent American drama films
American black-and-white films
Films directed by George Archainbaud
Selznick Pictures films
1920s American films